TNT, also referred to as TNT I, is the debut album by the eponymous Brazilian rock band TNT, their first of two self-titled albums. It was released in 1987 through RCA Records, and is considered a cornerstone of the Rio Grande do Sul rock scene from the mid-1980s/early 1990s. A critical and commercial success, it spawned a handful of hits, such as "Entra Nessa", "Estou na Mão", "Ana Banana" and "Identidade Zero" (all of them co-written by former vocalist Flávio Basso, prior to his departure from the band), which catapulted the group into nationwide fame and paved their way for a second release one year later.

The album's cover art was allegedly inspired by New Order's 1983 release Power, Corruption & Lies.

Covers
"Entra Nessa" was covered by former vocalist Flávio Basso's subsequent project, Os Cascavelletes, around the same time the album was released, on their first demo tape Vórtex Demo.

Track listing

Personnel
 Charles Master – vocals, bass guitar
 Márcio Petracco – electric guitar
 Luís Henrique "Tchê" Gomes – electric guitar
 Felipe Jotz – drums
 Reinaldo B. Brito – production

References

1987 debut albums
TNT (Brazilian band) albums
RCA Records albums